The Black Death was present in the Holy Roman Empire between 1348 and 1351. The Holy Roman Empire, composed of today's Germany, Switzerland, Austria, Belgium and the Netherlands, was, geographically, the largest country in Europe at the time, and the pandemic lasted several years due to the size of the Empire.

Several witness accounts do exist from the Black Death in the Holy Roman Empire, although they were often either written after the events took place, or are very short.

Background

The Holy Roman Empire in the mid-14th century

At this point in time, the Holy Roman Empire was the geographically largest nation in Europe, though the population of France was bigger. It was a personal union under the King of Bohemia, who was also the Holy Roman Emperor.

The Black Death

Since the outbreak of the Black Death at the Crimea, it had reached Sicily by an Italian ship from the Crimea. After having spread across the Italian states, and from Italy to France, the plague reached the borders of the Empire from France in the West, and from Italy in the South.

Progress of the plague

The bubonic plague pandemic known as the Black Death reached Switzerland and Austria from Northern Italy in the South and Savoy in the West, and the Rhine and Central Germany from Northern France, and Northern Germany from Denmark. It continued from the Empire East to the Baltics and finally to Russia.

Switzerland

The Black Death reached Switzerland south from Ticino in Italy, and West to Rhone and Geneva from Avignon in France. According to tradition, Mühldrof am Inn was the first German language city to be affected by the Black Death, on 29 June 1348.  Most of Switzerland was affected during the year of 1349, when the plague reached Bern, Zürich, Basel and Saint Gallen.

Austria

The Black Death in Austria is mainly described by the chronicle of the Neuberg Monastery in Steiermark. The Neuberg Chronicle dates the outbreak of plague in Austria to the feast of St Martin on 11 November 1348. In parallel with the plague, severe floods affected Austria. The plague interrupted the ongoing feud among the nobility, who were forced to cooperate against it. The Neuberg Chronicle describes an outbreak of festivities among the peasantry and public to distract themselves from the catastrophe, and how law and order collapsed.  The plague reached Vienna in May 1349, where it lasted until September and killed about one-third of the population.

Germany

Southern Germany

In the summer of 1349, the plague spread from Basel in Switzerland North toward Strasbourg. The plague reached Strasbourg from Colmar 8 July.

During the summer and autumn of 1349, the plague spread West from Strasbourg toward Mainz, Kassel, Limburg, Kreuznach, Sponheim and finally (in December) to Cologne; and East toward Augsburg, Ulm, Essingen and Stuttgart.

Northern Germany

The Black Death reached Northern Germany in the early summer of 1350 when it arrived in Magdeburg, Halberstadt, Lübeck and Hamburg. The plague appears to have reached the Northern port cities in different time periods, likely because it was spread by sea rather than land: the inland cities of Northern Germany, significantly, were affected at a later date in 1350 than the port cities along the North coast.

It finally reached Prussia and from there to the Baltics in 1351, and from there to Russia.

The Netherlands

The Black Death in the present-day Netherlands and Belgium are poorly documented. Due to this, it has often been described as free and unaffected of the plague.

It is known that the plague went as far as Hainaut and Flanders in the summer of 1349, but its progress further North cannot be traced, and there is no documentation of it in Central Netherlands. It is however confirmed that the ongoing reclaim of wetlands in Holland discontinued at this point, possibly because the population was suddenly smaller and there was, therefore, enough land for everyone.

The very Northern part of the Netherlands, Frisia, is documented to have been reached by the plague, where it came from Germany in 1350, and there is a description of it in Deventer and Zwolle.

Bohemia 

According to the traditional narrative, Bohemia was spared from the Black Death. This was also used as propaganda. Since the Black Death was commonly interpreted as a divine punishment for the Sins of humanity, the fact that Bohemia was spared was a great gain for the reputation of Bohemia, and the Bohemian elite and government made use of this.  In the famous chronicle Cronica Boemorum regum by Francis of Prague (Franciscus Pragensis), the king and the Kingdom of Bohemia were portrayed as free from the sins God's had sent the plague to punish the rest of Europe for, and the air as pure and clear.   With the exception of local outbreaks in Brno and Znojmo in Moravia in December 1351, no contemporary sources contradict the contemporary claim that Bohemia was spared.

The reason why Bohemia was spared from the plague is debated.  It has been suggested, that since Bohemia lacked water ways and could only be reached by land; and that most of the traffic came to Bohemia from Germany, where all traffic collapsed because of the Black Death there, the fact that the traffic from Germany was interrupted by the plague resulted in an unintentional quarantine, which spared Bohemia.

Consequences
See also Jewish persecutions during the Black Death

The Holy Roman Empire was the stage for both the Jewish pogroms as well as the flagellants during the Black Death.

As the plague progressed, the Jews were accused to have caused it by well poisoning. Rumours of well poisoning were spread in France, but they were directed more toward Jews within the borders of the Holy Roman Empire, where there was a larger Jewish population than in France.  The persecutions started to cause mass trials and mass executions of Jews in the Duchy of Savoy, and turned into massacres when the rumours of the trials in Savoy reached Switzerland and Germany.

According to the chronicler Heinrich von Diessenhoven, all Jews from Cologne to Austria were killed in a series of massacres between November 1348 and September 1349.

See also
 Basel massacre
 Erfurt massacre (1349)
 Strasbourg massacre

References

1340s in the Holy Roman Empire
1350s in the Holy Roman Empire
14th-century health disasters
Holy Roman Empire
Death in Belgium
Health disasters in Belgium